Country Club Estates is an unincorporated area and census-designated place (CDP) in Glynn County, Georgia, United States. It is part of the Brunswick, Georgia Metropolitan Statistical Area. The population was 8,373 at the 2020 census, down from 8,545 in 2010.

Geography
Country Club Estates is located at  (31.211438, -81.468663). It is bordered to the south by the city of Brunswick and to the east by the Back River, an arm of the tidal Mackay River. U.S. Route 17 passes through the center of the CDP, leading south  into downtown Brunswick and north  to Darien. The CDP extends north as far as Chapel Crossing Road west of US 17 and Yacht Drive east of US 17.

Demographics

2020 census

As of the 2020 United States census, there were 8,373 people, 3,319 households, and 1,869 families residing in the CDP.

2000 census
At the 2000 census there were 7,594 people, 3,134 households, and 2,018 families in the CDP. The racial makup of the CDP was 56.56% White, 38.90% African American, 0.30% Native American, 1.09% Asian, 0.13% Pacific Islander, 1.51% from other races, and 1.50% from two or more races. Hispanic or Latino of any race were 3.34%.

Of the 3,134 households 30.6% had children under the age of 18 living with them, 43.6% were married couples living together, 17.4% had a female householder with no husband present, and 35.6% were non-families. 29.5% of households were one person and 9.2% were one person aged 65 or older.  The average household size was 2.42 and the average family size was 3.01.

The age distribution was 26.2% under the age of 18, 10.2% from 18 to 24, 30.2% from 25 to 44, 22.3% from 45 to 64, and 11.1% 65 or older.  The median age was 34 years. For every 100 females, there were 91.0 males.  For every 100 females age 18 and over, there were 87.2 males.

The median household income was $36,794 and the median family income  was $42,359. Males had a median income of $30,621 versus $24,291 for females. The per capita income for the CDP was $18,080.  About 10.0% of families and 12.5% of the population were below the poverty line, including 18.0% of those under age 18 and 12.4% of those age 65 or over.

Education
The community's public schools are operated by the Glynn County School System.

Zoned schools serving sections of the CDP include:
 Altama Elementary School (AES) and C. B. Greer Elementary School (GRE)
 Needwood Middle School (NMS) and Jane Macon Middle School (JMS) (small section)
 Brunswick High School (BHS) and Glynn Academy (GA)

References

Census-designated places in Glynn County, Georgia
Census-designated places in Georgia (U.S. state)
Brunswick metropolitan area
Populated coastal places in Georgia (U.S. state)